Mechanochemistry (or mechanical chemistry) is the initiation of chemical reactions by mechanical phenomena. Mechanochemistry thus represents a fourth way to cause chemical reactions, complementing thermal reactions in fluids, photochemistry, and electrochemistry. Conventionally mechanochemistry focuses on the transformations of covalent bonds by mechanical force. Not covered by the topic are many phenomena: phase transitions, dynamics of biomolecules (docking, folding), and sonochemistry.

Mechanochemistry is not the same as mechanosynthesis, which refers specifically to the machine-controlled construction of complex molecular products.

In natural environments, mechanochemical reactions are frequently induced by physical processes such as earthquakes, glacier movement or hydraulic action of rivers or waves. In extreme environments such as subglacial lakes, hydrogen generated by mechnochemical reactions involving crushed silicate rocks and water can support methanogenic microbial communities. And mechanochemistry may have generated oxygen in the ancient Earth by water splitting on fractured mineral surfaces at high temperatures, potentially influencing life's origin or early evolution.

History 
The primal mechanochemical project was to make fire by rubbing pieces of wood against each other, creating friction and hence heat, triggering combustion at the elevated temperature. Another method involves the use of flint and steel, during which a spark (a small particle of pyrophoric metal) spontaneously combusts in air, starting fire instantaneously.

Industrial mechanochemistry began with the grinding of two solid reactants. Mercuric sulfide (the mineral cinnabar) and copper metal thereby react to produce mercury and copper sulfide:

A special issue of Chemical Society Review was dedicated to mechanochemistry.

Scientists recognized that mechanochemical reactions occur in environments naturally due to various processes, and the reaction products have the potential to influence microbial communities in tectonically active regions. The field has garnered increasing attention recently as mechanochemistry has the potential to generate diverse molecules capable of supporting extremophilic microbes, influencing the early evolution of life, developing the systems necessary for the origin of life, or supporting alien life forms. The field has now inspired the initiation of a special research topic in the journal Frontiers in Geochemistry.

Mechanical Processes

Natural 
Earthquakes crush rocks across Earth's subsurface and on other tectonically active planets. Rivers also frequently abrade rocks, revealing fresh mineral surfaces and waves at a shore erode cliffs fracture rocks and abrade sediments.

Similarly to rivers and oceans, the mechanical power of glaciers is evidenced by their impact on landscapes. As glaciers move downslope, they abrade rocks, generating fractured mineral surfaces that can partake in mechanochemical reactions.

Unnatural 
In laboratories, planetary ball mills are typically used to induce crushing to investigate natural processes.

Mechanochemical transformations are often complex and different from thermal or photochemical mechanisms. Ball milling is a widely used process in which mechanical force is used to achieve chemical transformations.

It eliminates the need for many solvents, offering the possibility that mechanochemistry could help make many industries more environmentally friendly. For example, the mechanochemical process has been used to synthesize pharmaceutically-attractive phenol hydrazones.

Chemical Reactions 
Mechanochemical reactions encompass reactions between mechanically fractured solid materials and any other reactants present in the environment. However, natural mechanochemical reactions frequently involve the reaction of water with crushed rock, so called water-rock reactions. Mechanochemistry is typically initiated by the breakage of bonds between atoms within many different mineral types.

Silicates 
Silicates are the most common minerals in the Earth's crust, and thus comprise the mineral type most commonly involved in natural mechanochemical reactions. Silicates are made up of silicon and oxygen atoms, typically arranged in silicon tetrahedra. Mechanical processes break the bonds between the silicon and oxygen atoms. If the bonds are broken by a homolytic cleavage, unpaired electrons are generated:

≡Si–O–Si≡ → ≡Si–O• + ≡Si•

≡Si–O–O–Si≡ → ≡Si–O• + ≡Si–O•

≡Si–O–O–Si≡ → ≡Si–O–O• + ≡Si•

Hydrogen Generation 
The reaction of water with silicon radicals can generate hydrogen radicals:

2≡Si• + 2H2O → 2≡Si–O–H + 2H•

2H• → H2

This mechanism can generate H2 to support methanogens in environments with few other energy sources. However, at higher temperatures (~>80 °C), hydrogen radicals react with siloxyl radicals, preventing the generation of H2 by this mechanism:

≡Si–O• + H• → ≡Si–O–H

2H• → H2

Oxidant Generation 
When oxygen reacts with silicon or oxygen radicals at the surface of crushed rocks, it can chemically adsorb to the surface:

≡Si• + O2 →  ≡Si–O–O•

≡Si–O• + O2 →  ≡Si–O–O–O•

These oxygen radicals can then generate oxidants such as hydroxyl radicals and hydrogen peroxide:

≡Si–O–O• + H2O → ≡Si–O–O–H + •OH

2•OH → H2O2

Additionally, oxidants may be generated in the absence of oxygen at high temperatures:

≡Si–O• + H2O → ≡Si–O–H + •OH

2•OH → H2O2

H2O2 breaks down naturally in environments to form water and Oxygen gas:

2H2O2 → 2H2O + O2

Industry applications 
Fundamentals and applications ranging from nano materials to technology have been reviewed. The approach has been used to synthesize metallic nanoparticles, catalysts, magnets, γ‐graphyne, metal iodates, nickel–vanadium carbide and molybdenum–vanadium carbide nanocomposite powders.

Ball milling has been used to separate hydrocarbon gases from crude oil. The process used 1-10% of the energy of conventional cryogenics. Differential absorption is affected by milling intensity, pressure and duration. The gases are recovered by heating, at a specific temperature for each gas type. The process has successfully processed alkyne, olefin and paraffin gases using boron nitride powder.

Storage 
Mechanochemistry has potential for energy-efficient solid-state storage of hydrogen, ammonia and other fuel gases. The resulting powder is safer than conventional methods of compression and liquefaction.

See also 
 Embryonic differentiation waves
 Mechanoluminescence
 Tribology

Further reading 

 Lenhardt, J. M.; Ong, M. T.; Choe, R.; Evenhuis, C. R.; Martinez, T. J.; Craig, S. L., Trapping a Diradical Transition State by Mechanochemical Polymer Extension. Science 2010, 329 (5995), 1057-1060

References

Chemistry